Candalides parsonsi is a species of butterfly of the family Lycaenidae. It was described by W. John Tennent in 2005. It is found on Normanby Island, Papua New Guinea.

References

Candalidini
Butterflies described in 2005